Brazza may refer to:

Brazza (Lat. Brattia) Italian name of the Croatian island of Brač, placed in the Adriatic sea
Cora Slocomb di Brazza also Brazzà (1862–1944), American-born Italian activist and businesswoman
Pierre Savorgnan de Brazza (1852–1905), Italian-born, naturalized French explorer. 
Jacques Savorgnan de Brazza (1859–1888), Italian naturalist